The Tarantula Nebula (also known as 30 Doradus) is a large H II region in the Large Magellanic Cloud (LMC), forming its south-east corner (from Earth's perspective).

Discovery

The Tarantula Nebula was observed by Nicolas-Louis de Lacaille during an expedition to the Cape of Good Hope between 1751 and 1753. He catalogued it as the second of the "Nebulae of the First Class", "Nebulosities not accompanied by any star visible in the telescope of two feet". It was described as a diffuse nebula 20' across.

Johann Bode included the Tarantula in his 1801 Uranographia star atlas and listed it in the accompanying Allgemeine Beschreibung und Nachweisung der Gestirne catalogue as number 30 in the constellation "Xiphias or Dorado". Instead of being given a stellar magnitude, it was noted to be nebulous.

The name Tarantula Nebula arose in the mid 20th century from its appearance in deep photographic exposures.

30 Doradus has often been treated as the designation of a star, or of the central star cluster NGC 2070, but is now generally treated as referring to the whole nebula area of the Tarantula Nebula.

Properties
The Tarantula Nebula has an apparent magnitude of 8. Considering its distance of about 49 kpc (160,000 light-years), this is an extremely luminous non-stellar object. Its luminosity is so great that if it were as close to Earth as the Orion Nebula, the Tarantula Nebula would cast visible shadows. In fact, it is the most active starburst region known in the Local Group of galaxies.

It is also one of the largest H II regions in the Local Group with an estimated diameter around 200 to 570 pc, and also because of its very large size, it is sometimes described as the largest, although other H II regions such as NGC 604, which is in the Triangulum Galaxy, could be larger. The nebula resides on the leading edge of the LMC where ram pressure stripping, and the compression of the interstellar medium likely resulting from this, is at a maximum.

NGC 2070

30 Doradus has at its centre the star cluster NGC 2070 which includes the compact concentration of stars known as R136 that produces most of the energy that makes the nebula visible. The estimated mass of the cluster is 450,000 solar masses, suggesting it will likely become a globular cluster in the future.  In addition to NGC 2070, the Tarantula Nebula contains a number of other star clusters including the much older Hodge 301. The most massive stars of Hodge 301 have already exploded in supernovae.

Supernova 1987A
The closest supernova observed since the invention of the telescope, Supernova 1987A, occurred in the outskirts of the Tarantula Nebula.  There is a prominent supernova remnant enclosing the open cluster NGC 2060, but the remnants of many other supernovae are difficult to detect in the complex nebulosity.

Black hole VFTS 243
An x-ray quiet black hole was discovered in the Tarantula Nebula, the first outside of the Milky Way Galaxy that does not radiate strongly. The black hole has a mass of at least 9 solar masses and is in a circular orbit with its 25 solar mass blue giant companion VFTS 243.

See also
List of largest nebulae
NGC 604

References

External links

 
 APOD Images: 2003 August 23 & 2010 May 18
 SEDS Data: NGC 2070, The Tarantula Nebula
 Hubble Space Telescope Images of: The Tarantula Nebula 
 European Southern Observatory Image of: The Tarantula Nebula 
 The Scale of the Universe (Astronomy Picture of the Day 2012 March 12)
 

 
H II regions
NGC objects
Large Magellanic Cloud
Dorado (constellation)
103b
17511205
Articles containing video clips
Star-forming regions